Yuan Chengye (1924–2018) was a Chinese organic chemist.

Yuan was born in Shangyu, Zhejiang province in 1924. He graduated from National College of Pharmacy (now China Pharmaceutical University) in 1948 and received Degree for Candidate for D.Sc from All-Union Research Institute of Pharmaceutical Chemistry, Moscow in 1955. He worked at the Shanghai Institute of Organic Chemistry, Chinese Academy of Sciences after returning to China. He led a research team for nuclear fuel extractants since 1958. In 1997, he was elected an academician of the Chinese Academy of Sciences. He died on 9 January 2018.

References 

1924 births
2018 deaths
Chemists from Zhejiang
China Pharmaceutical University alumni
Members of the Chinese Academy of Sciences
Organic chemists
People from Shangyu
Scientists from Shaoxing